Pazarlar is a town and a district of Kütahya Province in the Aegean region of Turkey.

References

	 

Populated places in Kütahya Province
Districts of Kütahya Province